Henry G. Wilhelm is an American researcher and author known for his studies of the archival properties of photographic printing processes. In 1981 he received a Guggenheim Fellowship in Photographic Studies  to continue his work studying photographic processes.

He is the co-author, along with Carol Brower Wilhelm, of the 1993 book The Permanence and Care of Color Photographs: Traditional and Digital Color Prints, Color Negatives, Slides, and Motion Pictures. They are the founders of Wilhelm Imaging Research.

References

External links
 Wilhelm Imaging official site

Year of birth missing (living people)
Living people
American male writers
Photographic processes